The Dhruve Pandove Stadium is a cricket ground in Patiala, India. The ground was previously known as Rajendra Gymkhana Club or Baradari Ground. The ground is home ground for Punjab cricket team. The ground has hosted 69 first-class matches. Most of Southern Punjab's home games were played at Dhruve Pandove Stadium. The ground is one of the oldest grounds in Punjab. In 2014, the stadium hosted its first first-class match since 17 year between Punjab and Haryana. The stadium is named after one of the best young cricketer Dhruve Pandove in India who died in a road accident in 1992.

References

External links
Cricinfo profile
Cricketarchive.com 

1926 establishments in India
Cricket grounds in Punjab, India
Multi-purpose stadiums in India
Sports venues completed in 1926
Sports venues in Punjab, India
20th-century architecture in India